Freddie Nanda Dekker-Oversteegen (6 September 1925 – 5 September 2018) was a Dutch resistance member during the occupation of the Netherlands in World War II.

Early life
Freddie Oversteegen was born 6 September 1925 in the village of Schoten, Netherlands.
She had an older sister, Truus Menger-Oversteegen.
She and her family lived on a barge.
Before the war, the Oversteegen family harbored people from Lithuania in the hold of their ship, hidden.
After the divorce of her parents, Oversteegen was raised by her mother,
She moved from the barge to a small apartment.
Oversteegen's mother would later remarry and give birth to her half-brother.
The family lived in poverty.

World War II
During the war, the Oversteegen family hid a Jewish couple in their home.
Freddie Oversteegen and her older sister Truus began handing out anti-Nazi pamphlets, which attracted the notice of Haarlem Council of Resistance commander Frans van der Wiel.
With their mother's permission, the girls joined the Council of Resistance, which brought them into a coordinated effort.
Freddie was fourteen years old at the time.

Oversteegen, her sister, and friend Hannie Schaft worked to sabotage the Nazi military presence in the Netherlands. They used dynamite to disable bridges and railroad tracks.
Additionally, they aided Jewish children by smuggling them out of the country or helping them escape concentration camps.

The Oversteegens and Schaft also killed German soldiers, with Freddie being the first of the girls to kill a soldier by shooting him while riding her bicycle. They also lured soldiers to the woods under the pretense of a romantic overture and then killed them. Oversteegen would approach the soldiers in taverns and bars and ask them to "go for a stroll" in the forest.

Post-war
Oversteegen served as a board member on the National Hannie Schaft Foundation, which was established by her sister, Truus.
In 2014, Freddie and Truus were awarded the Mobilisation War Cross (Mobilisatie-Oorlogskruis) by Dutch Prime Minister Mark Rutte for their acts of resistance during the war. There is also a street named after her in Haarlem.

Oversteegen experienced a series of heart attacks towards the end of her life. She died on 5 September 2018 in a nursing home in Driehuis, one day before her 93rd birthday.

Personal life
Freddie Oversteegen married Jan Dekker.
They had three children.

References

1925 births
2018 deaths
People from Haarlem
Dutch communists
Dutch resistance members
Female resistance members of World War II